Samba  is a 2014 French comedy-drama film co-written and directed by Éric Toledano and Olivier Nakache. It is their second collaboration with actor Omar Sy following The Intouchables (2012).

The film premiered at the Toronto International Film Festival on 7 September 2014. It was released theatrically in France on 15 October 2014, before receiving a limited theatrical release in the United States on 24 July 2015.

Premise
Samba Cissé (Sy), a migrant from Senegal to France, works as a dish washer in a hotel. After a bureaucratic slip-up lands him in detention, he is ordered to leave France. With the help of a businesswoman (Charlotte Gainsbourg), he fights to stay in France.

Cast
 Omar Sy as Samba Cissé
 Charlotte Gainsbourg as Alice
 Tahar Rahim as Wilson
 Izïa Higelin as Manu
 Hélène Vincent as Marcelle
 Liya Kebede as Magali
 Clotilde Mollet as Josiane
 Isaka Sawadogo as Jonas 
 Jacqueline Jehanneuf as Maggy
 Youngar Fall as Lamouna
 Christiane Millet as Madeleine
 Sabine Pakora as Gracieuse
 Olivier Nakache as the poney club host
 Éric Toledano as the bartender

Reception
The review aggregation website Rotten Tomatoes gives the film an approval rating of 61% based on 66 reviews and an average score of 5.9/10. The site's critics consensus reads, "Samba isn't the finest effort from directors Olivier Nakache and Eric Toledano, but the film's shortcomings are partly balanced by its big heart and talented cast." On Metacritic, which assigns a normalised rating out of 100 based on reviews from mainstream critics, the film has a score of 53 based on 22 reviews, indicating "mixed or average reviews". Audiences surveyed by CinemaScore gave the film an average grade of "B–" on an A+ to F scale.

Peter Debruge of Variety called the film "A highly polished, widely appealing big-budget French movie." He praised Sy's performance, writing, "If nothing else, the pic cements Sy's position as one of France's most magnetic screen personalities, even more compelling to watch in serious scenes than in the obligatory comedic bits." Jordan Adler gave the film a positive review in We Got This Covered, saying, "The immigrant's struggle is brought to pulsating life in Samba, which works best as an affecting and amusing star vehicle for Omar Sy."

However, Jordan Mintzer of The Hollywood Reporter criticized the film's plot: "The film's message is lost amid too many plot contrivances." He concluded that it is "another crowdpleasing social dramedy from the makers of "Intouchables", though one that wears out its welcome without bringing its message home." Mark Adams from Screen Daily in his review said that it is a "well-meaning and occasionally joyous film that is ultimately too scattershot in its format and tone to really work".

References

External links
 
 
 

2014 films
2014 comedy-drama films
2010s Arabic-language films
2010s English-language films
Films about immigration
Films based on French novels
Films directed by Olivier Nakache and Éric Toledano
Films scored by Ludovico Einaudi
Films shot in Paris
French comedy-drama films
2010s French-language films
Gaumont Film Company films
2010s Portuguese-language films
2010s Russian-language films
2010s Serbian-language films
2014 multilingual films
French multilingual films
2010s French films